The Manadero is a river of the Province of Guadalajara, Spain. Its source is at Portillo in the Sierra de Pela mountains.

References

Rivers of Spain
Rivers of Castilla–La Mancha
Geography of the Province of Guadalajara